Himmelblau is a German language surname, which means "skyblue".  The name may refer to:

David Himmelblau (1924–2011), American scientist
Fabian Himmelblau (1860–1931), Polish bookseller and publisher

See also
Coop Himmelb(l)au, an architectural firm
Himmelblau's function, in mathematical optimization
PerfektBreitHimmelblau, a set of songs

References

German-language surnames
German words and phrases
Jewish surnames